Dharmaraj Ravanan (born 27 July 1987) is an Indian professional football player who plays as a defender. He most recently appeared with I-League club Real Kashmir.

Career
Ravanan started his professional career at Dempo S.C., coach Armando Colaco saw him in Bangalore when he was playing for Chennai's Indian Bank and he gave him an opportunity and at 19 he joined them where he learned a lot from his teammates. The following year he moved to Mohun Bagan, but there it was a different experience and thereafter he joined Mahindra United. At Mahindra United he learned a lot from his coaches Derrick Pereira and David Booth. Then he joined Churchill Brothers. He captained Churchill Brothers to the I-League(2013) and Federation Cup(2014) titles. He also played for FC Pune City in the inaugural edition of the Indian Super League. He later joined new entrants Bharat FC for the 2014-15 I-League On Loan from FC Pune City season after Churchill Brothers had been axed from the 2014–15 season for failing to pass the club licensing criteria. While he continued to play for FC Pune City for next Two Season 2015 & 2016 in the Indian Super League.In 2015–16 I-League Season he joined SC de Goa on Loan from his ISL Team FC Pune City. Later he Joined His Home Town Club Chennai City F.C. in the I-League 2016–17 and Captained his Team through the Season and remained with the Club for next Season as well in 2017–18 I-League.

Honours

India U23
SAFF Championship: 2009

Churchill Brothers
Durand Cup: 2011
IFA Shield: 2011
I-League: 2012–13
Federation Cup: 2013–14

Mohun Bagan
Federation Cup 2006

Mahindra United
IFA shield – 2008
Durand cup – 2008–2009

Real Kashmir
IFA Shield: 2020

References

External links
 Profile at Goal.com
 
 Profile at indiansuperleague.com

Indian footballers
1987 births
Living people
People from Tiruchirappalli district
Footballers from Tamil Nadu
Dempo SC players
Mohun Bagan AC players
Mahindra United FC players
Churchill Brothers FC Goa players
FC Pune City players
Bharat FC players
Chennai City FC players
Real Kashmir FC players
I-League players
Indian Super League players
Association football defenders
Footballers at the 2010 Asian Games
Asian Games competitors for India
Sporting Clube de Goa players
Gokulam Kerala FC players
India youth international footballers